Daniel Koppel (born 8 September 1977), known professionally as Danny K, is a South African singer, songwriter and actor. He holds a Bachelor of Arts degree from Wits University. Danny has been nominated multiple times for a SAMA (South African Music Award) and has won four times. He has two consecutive Kids Choice Awards, two consecutive Crystal Awards (People's Choice Awards), YOU magazine Award for Best South African Musician, and The South African STYLE Award. Danny was also voted number 34 in the Heat Magazine's Hot 100 for 2007. He was voted by First National Bank's national survey as one of South Africa's few role models, as well as South Africa's most trustworthy 100 public personalities by Reader's Digest, where he took 1st place, which saw the pot of R100 000 donated to Compassionate Friends, a grief-counseling service in memory of his late brother.

Personal life

Marriage and children
Danny Koppel married Lisa Gundelfinger in 2012 and together have two sons.

Awards

Discography

Albums

Movies
Crazy Monkey Presents Straight Outta Benoni 2005
Bunny Chow 2006

References

1977 births
Living people
South African singer-songwriters
21st-century South African male singers
Singers from Johannesburg